is a town located in Tokachi Subprefecture, Hokkaido, Japan.

As of September 2016, the town has an estimated population of 6,285 and a density of 5.9 persons per km2. The total area is 1,063.79 km2. Surrounding towns include Sahoro, Shimizu, and Shikaoi.

While Japan Bandy Federation was founded in 2011, there has not been any full-sized bandy field in the country. So domestically only the variety rink bandy has been played. However, in the summer of 2017 an association for bandy was founded in Shintoku and it was announced that a full-sized field will open in the 2017-18 winter season. It became a reality in December 2017 and the first Japanese championship took place there in January 2018, with the home teams capturing the titles.

Climate

Mascots

They are based on toku heroes such as Super Sentai, Kamen Rider and Ultraman. The team consists of three members.
 is the leader of the team who is from Shintoku. His motif is a soba. His job is to make sure all of the food (especially soba) had the best quality and cooked safe to prevent foodborne illnesses. His birthday is August 17.
 is the second in command of the team who is from Mount Tomuraushi in the Shintoku Mountains. His motif is mountains such as Mount Tomuraushi and Mount Sahoro. His job is to protect nature and the environment from pollution. His birthday is October 12.
. She is the only female of the team who is from Shintoku but raised in the United States. Her motif is the onsen. His job is to heal people from diseases or injury while maintaining beauty and health. Her birthday is February 19.

In 2014, four more members were added as a result of a design competition.
 who is a soba (like SobaRed but in colours of a rainbow)
 who is a brown chicken.
 who is a princess of chocolate.
 who is cat-like shadow figure that represents the night sky.

References

External links

Official Website 

Towns in Hokkaido